King Hazen (30 September 1885 – 4 July 1974) was a Progressive Conservative party and National Government member of the House of Commons of Canada. He was born in Fredericton, New Brunswick and became a barrister by career.

He was first elected to Parliament under the National Government (Conservative) party banner at the St. John—Albert riding in the 1940 general election after an unsuccessful campaign there as a Conservative in 1935. He was re-elected in 1945 as a Progressive Conservative for another term then defeated in the 1949 election by Daniel Aloysius Riley of the Liberal party.

Electoral record

References

External links
 

1885 births
1974 deaths
Politicians from Fredericton
Members of the House of Commons of Canada from New Brunswick
Progressive Conservative Party of Canada MPs
Conservative Party of Canada (1867–1942) MPs